Bafoulabé Cercle is an administrative subdivision of the Kayes Region of Mali.  The administrative center (chef-lieu) is the town of  Bafoulabé. In the 2009 census the population of the cercle  was 233,926.

The cercle is divided into thirteen communes:

Bafoulabé    
Bamafele    
Diakon    
Diallan    
Diokeli    
Gounfan    
Kontela    
Koundian
Mahina    
Niambia    
Oualia    
Sidibela    
Tomora

References

Cercles of Mali
Kayes Region